A boat trailer is  designed to launch, retrieve, carry and sometimes store boats.

Commercial boat trailers

Commercial hydraulic boat trailers are used by marinas, boat yards, boat haulers, boat dealers and boat builders. Generally this type of trailer is not used for storage of the boat.

Self-propelled
Self-propelled boat movers are not strictly trailers, but hydraulically operated boat movers, with their own tractor unit. They share all of the features of hydraulic boat trailers.

Non-commercial boat trailers
This type of trailer is usually used by the boat owner/operator. The trailer is also used for storage.

 Roll-on, also known as a "Roller style trailer", uses rubber and/or polyurethane rollers for ease of launching and loading a boat.
 Glide-path, also known as a "Float-on style trailer", allows the boat to float onto the trailer; after the trailer has been partially submerged (usually  of the trailer). Since its inception, it has become quite popular compared to the "Roller style trailer".

See also 
 Boat dolly, a device for launching small boats not suitable for towing.
 Dolly (trailer)
 Flatbed trolley
 Maritime shipping Roll trailer
 Trailer sailer

References 

Boats
Boat Trailer
Freight transport